Al-Ubedy is a neighborhood in Baghdad, Iraq. 

Ubedy